Creach Bheinn is a prominent mountain in the Morvern area in the west of Scotland. It is less steep and even less frequently climbed than its northern neighbour, Garbh Bheinn, but the views to the south and west to the islands are open and extensive.

Ascents
Compared with other hills in the Ardgour area, the slopes of Creach Bheinn are smooth. The best starting point is on the west side of the bridge at Glengalmadale. Parking is limited but sufficient for current demand. From there, a wet track followed by a boggy path lead up Glen Galmadale to the foot of the mountain, which is easily ascended. Alternatively, some or all of a horseshoe ridge can be included.

Summit Camp
Near the summit there are ruins of a camp, which is thought to have been used by early surveyors.

References

 The Corbetts and Other Scottish Hills, (SMC Guide) .
 Caledonia Hilltreks

Corbetts
Marilyns of Scotland
Mountains and hills of the Northwest Highlands